The North Face is a 1948 heterosexual romance novel by Mary Renault, who later became famous for historical novels set in ancient Greece and featuring homosexual love between male characters. The protagonists are Neil Langton and Ellen Shorland, both of whom have tragic pasts and both of whom are staying at a boarding house in Cornwall. They both have a passion for mountain climbing, which is what first brings them together. Neil is in the process of obtaining a divorce from an adulterous wife, whilst mourning the death of his young daughter, and Ellen is mourning the loss of her first love Jock, who died in World War II, believing herself incapable of loving again. The novel is set in the period immediately after the end of the war.

Review 
From the Introduction by Sarah Dunant (2014) in the Virago Modern Classics edition:

In her fifth novel North Face (1949) nursing becomes character rather than plot. Inside a love story between two guests in a Yorkshire [sic] boarding house after the war, Renault uses two women in their thirties as a kind of sparring Greek chorus, ruminating on the morality (or not) of the affair. Already very much professional spinsters, one is a desiccated prissy academic, while the other is a blowzy, more down-to-earth professional nurse. Though the satire is at the expense of them both (at times they are more entertaining than the rather laboured love story), the nurse at least feels in touch with life. If Mary Renault had ever considered academia, this is surely her verdict on the choice she made.

References 

British romance novels
1948 British novels
Novels by Mary Renault
Novels set in Cornwall
Longman books